The Mission de Phénicie was the first major archaeological mission to Lebanon and Syria. It took place in 1860-61 by a French team led by Ernest Renan. Renan was entrusted with the mission in October 1860, after French interest had been sparked by the 1855 discovery of the Eshmunazar II sarcophagus.

The Phoenician artefacts and inscriptions that discovered by the mission were published in Renan's Mission de Phénicie (1864–74; “Phoenician Expedition”), published by Imprimerie impériale in Paris 1864, and republished by Beyrouth in 1997.

Volumes
 Text:  and 
 Plates:  and 
 Catalogue des objets provenant de la Mission de Phénicie

Bibliography

  
  

1864 non-fiction books
Archaeology books